was a pioneer of Japanese rocketry, popularly known as "Dr. Rocket," and described in the media as the father of Japan's space development.

The near-Earth asteroid 25143 Itokawa was named in honor of Itokawa, and is notable as the target of the Hayabusa mission.

Biography
Born in Tokyo, Itokawa skipped grades in school and graduated from the Tokyo Imperial University in 1935, having majored in aeronautical engineering. In 1941, he became an assistant professor of the Imperial University of Tokyo. During World War II, he was involved in designing aircraft at the Nakajima Aircraft Company and designed the Nakajima Ki-43 Hayabusa ("Peregrine Falcon"; Allied reporting name "Oscar") fighter. 

Itokawa became a full professor in 1948. In 1955 Itokawa worked on the Pencil Rocket for Japan's space program. He retired from his post at the university in 1967 and established an institute.

Itokawa wrote 49 books, and was a best-selling author. Topics that Itokawa became interested in or took as a hobby, include such sports as basketball, golf and swimming, as well as orchestral arrangements and such instruments as cello, harmonica, organ, piano, violin and taishōgoto (a string instrument invented in Japan). He was also interested in baton twirling, brain waves, English plays, Mah Jong, philosophy,  rocket engineering and novel writing.

Bibliography
 Gyakuten no Hasso
 Hachijussai no Aria
 Koya wo Yuku

References

1912 births
1999 deaths
Scientists from Tokyo
Academic staff of the University of Tokyo
Aircraft designers
Rocket scientists
Japanese aerospace engineers